Ander Vidorreta Larrumbe (born 12 July 1997) is a Spanish footballer who plays as a central midfielder for Real Avilés CF.

Club career
Born in Soria, Castile and León, Vidorreta represented CD Numancia as a youth. He made his senior debut with the reserves on 27 August 2016, starting in a 7–0 Tercera División home routing of SD Almazán.

Vidorreta scored his senior goal on 17 December 2016, netting the opener in a 2–0 home defeat of CD Bupolsa. On 25 June 2019, after being an ever-present figure for the B-side, he was definitely promoted to the main squad after agreeing to a one-year deal.

On 8 December 2019, Vidorreta made his first team debut by starting in a 1–3 away loss against UD Las Palmas in the Segunda División championship. On 3 October of the following year, he moved to Segunda División B side SD Tarazona on a free transfer.

References

External links

1997 births
Living people
People from Soria
Sportspeople from the Province of Soria
Spanish footballers
Footballers from Castile and León
Association football midfielders
Segunda División players
Segunda División B players
Segunda Federación players
Tercera División players
CD Numancia B players
CD Numancia players
SD Tarazona footballers
Real Avilés CF footballers